Stanley Raymond McMaster (23 September 1926 – 20 October 1992) was a Unionist politician in Northern Ireland and a barrister at Lincoln's Inn in London.

He was elected as an Ulster Unionist Party Member of Parliament for Belfast East at the 1959 by-election.  He held the seat until the February 1974 UK general election, when he lost standing as a Pro-Assembly Unionist to the Vanguard leader William Craig.

At the October 1974 UK general election, McMaster stood unsuccessfully as an "Independent Ulster Unionist" candidate in Belfast South, taking third place with 9.8% of the vote.

References 
Times Guide to the House of Commons February 1974

External links 
 

1926 births
1992 deaths
Members of the Parliament of the United Kingdom for Belfast constituencies (since 1922)
UK MPs 1955–1959
UK MPs 1959–1964
UK MPs 1964–1966
UK MPs 1966–1970
UK MPs 1970–1974
Barristers from Northern Ireland
Members of the Bar of Northern Ireland
Ulster Unionist Party members of the House of Commons of the United Kingdom
Independent politicians in Northern Ireland